Mohamed Methnani (born March 3, 1992 in Le Bardo) is a Tunisian football player. He currently plays for  Étoile Sahel .

Club career
Methnani began his career in 2002 in the junior ranks of Espérance Tunis, where he spent 6 seasons. He then joined cross town rivals Club Africain. In 2011, the club offered a five-year professional contract but he turned it down due to its length. Instead, he joined Qatari club El Jaish, with the club playing a 30,000 Tunisian dinars transfer fee.

References

External links
 El Jaish Profile
 
 Qatar Stars League Profile

1992 births
Club Africain players
El Jaish SC players
Espérance Sportive de Tunis players
Expatriate footballers in Qatar
People from Tunis Governorate
Qatar Stars League players
Tunisian expatriate footballers
Tunisian footballers
Living people
Association football midfielders
Al-Qadsiah FC players
Étoile Sportive du Sahel players
Tunisian expatriate sportspeople in Saudi Arabia
Expatriate footballers in Saudi Arabia
Saudi Professional League players